Al-Sabehat is a swimmer delivery vehicle built and operated by Iran. It can carry out coastal reconnaissance missions, planting naval mines on ports and anchorages, as well as lifting special forces. According to Abhijit Singh, a senior fellow at Observer Research Foundation, the SDV "can be used effectively for unconventional attacks". 

 ships function as a mothership for Al-Sabehat SDVs.

Al-Sabehat SDV is designed at Esfahan Underwater Research Centre.
Planning and construction of Al-Sabehat was reportedly started in 1996 and the first vessel was unveiled on 29 August 2000.

See also
 List of submarine classes in service
 List of naval ship classes of Iran
 List of military equipment manufactured in Iran

References 

Wet subs
Submarine classes of the Islamic Republic of Iran Navy
Ship classes of the Islamic Revolutionary Guard Corps
Ships built by Marine Industries Organization
Diver propulsion equipment